Jayantilal Parekh was an Indian politician from Mumbai who served as an Member of Legislative Assembly (MLA) from Ghatkopar. He was from Janata Party. In 1978, he won the assembly election from Ghatkopar assembly constituency.  He has also served as the municipal councillor.
In 1973, he was elected as municipal councillor from Ward No. 132.

References 

People from Maharashtra
People from Mumbai
Maharashtra politicians
Maharashtra local politicians
Maharashtra MLAs 1978–1980
Janata Party politicians
Maharashtra municipal councillors